A  is a landscape in Japan, which has evolved together with the way of life and geocultural features of a region, and which is indispensable for understanding the lifestyle of the Japanese people, and is recognized by the government of under article 2, paragraph 1, item 5 of the Law for the Protection of Cultural Properties (1950).

Local governments that are in charge of designated Cultural Landscapes can obtain financial assistance from the Agency for Cultural Affairs for surveys and other research, the preparation of preservation plans, maintenance, repair, landscaping, restoration, disaster prevention, and promotional and educational activities.

Background
Research into cultural landscapes began before the Second World War with increasing concern about their disappearance. Historical research into shōen and rural engineering, the scientific investigation of geographic features, and studies for urban and countryside planning have since increased. The movement to protect cultural landscapes has also been influenced by the Law Concerning Special Measures for the Preservation of Historical Natural Features in Ancient Cities (1966), the international trend for recognising "cultural landscapes" under the World Heritage Convention, the designation in 1980 of Mount Hakusan, Mount Ōdaigahara & Mount Ōmine, Shiga Highland and Yakushima as UNESCO Man and the Biosphere Reserves, the designation of Monuments of Japan, and initiatives such as the 100 selected terraced rice fields of Japan. From 2000 to 2003 a study was made to define the concept of "cultural landscape" and identify their distribution, with 2,311 areas identified in the first phase and 502 selected for the second, 180 being of particular importance.

Selection criteria of Important Cultural Landscapes
Important Cultural Landscapes are designated based on their type as:

single-type Cultural Landscapes associated with
agriculture such as rice paddies, farmlands, etc.
man-made grassland or livestock ranching such as hayfields, pastureland, etc.
forests such as timber forests, disaster prevention forests, etc.
fisheries such as fish cultivation rafts, nori seaweed cultivation fields, etc.
water uses such as reservoirs, waterways, harbors, etc.
mining or industrial manufacture such as mines, quarries, groups of workshops, etc.
transportation and communication such as roads, plazas, etc.
residences and settlements such as stonewalls, hedges, coppices attached to premises, etc.
a combination of two or more of the above cultural landscapes.

List of Important Cultural Landscapes

Usage
An overview of what is included in the table and the manner of sorting is as follows: the columns (with the exceptions of Remarks and Pictures) are sortable by pressing the arrows symbols.
Name: the English name as used by the Agency for Cultural Affairs and Japanese name as registered in the Database of National Cultural Properties
Criteria: the selection criteria for the designation as Important Cultural Landscape
Remarks: general remarks
Location: "town-name prefecture-name"; The column entries sort as "prefecture-name town-name".
Year: year of designation as Important Cultural Landscape
Picture: picture of (part of) the Important Cultural Landscape

List

See also
  — international.

Historic American Landscapes Survey (HALS) — U.S. cultural landscape heritage documentation program.

References

Bibliography

Further reading

Cultural Landscapes of Japan